Peadar Gaskins was an Irish footballer who played as a defender.

Career
Gaskins was born in Dublin. He joined Shamrock Rovers in 1932 where he stayed for five seasons.

He won five caps for the Republic of Ireland captaining the side in all of his five appearances. He made his debut as captain in a 4–4 draw against Belgium which was Ireland's first World Cup qualifier on 25 February 1934. He played in the next four games: a 5–2 World Cup qualifier defeat to Holland in the Olympic Stadium (Amsterdam), a friendly against Hungary at Dalymount Park, a friendly against Switzerland in Basel with his last cap coming against Germany in the Stadion Rote Erde on 8 May 1935.

He captained the League of Ireland XI team in a 2–1 victory over the Welsh Football League XI in his only Inter League appearance on 18 March 1935.

On 27 August 1937, Gaskins had a benefit match at Shelbourne Park.

Gaskins later moved to St James's Gate F.C. where he won the FAI Cup in the 1937–38 season, scoring a penalty in the 2–1 victory over Dundalk F.C.

Honours
Shamrock Rovers
 FAI Cup: 1933, 1936
 League of Ireland Shield: 1932–33, 1934–35
 Leinster Senior Cup: 1933

St James's Gate F.C.
 FAI Cup: 1938

References

Sources 
 The Hoops by Paul Doolan and Robert Goggins
 
 

Year of birth missing
Year of death missing
Association footballers from County Dublin
Association football defenders
Republic of Ireland association footballers
Republic of Ireland international footballers
Shamrock Rovers F.C. players
League of Ireland players
League of Ireland XI players
St James's Gate F.C. players